ANSI C12.22 is the American National Standard for Protocol Specification for Interfacing to Data Communication Networks

ANSI C12.22/IEEE Std 1703 describe a protocol for transporting ANSI C12.19 table data over networks, for the purpose of interoperability among communications modules and meters. This standard uses AES encryption to enable strong, secure communications, including confidentiality and data integrity. The cipher mode used, a derivation of EAX mode called EAX' (EAX prime), is provably secure in the context of C12.22.  However, this cipher mode cannot be used securely for non-standard short messages (messages less than the key length of 16 bytes). Its security model is extensible to support new security mechanisms.

ANSI C12.22/IEEE Std 1703 define message services which are components of an Advanced Metering Infrastructure (AMI) for smart grids.

There is also  for transporting C12.22 data using TCP and UDP transport over IP networks.

The ANSI C12.22 / IEEE Std 1703 service and domains consist of ANSI C12.22 / IEEE Std 1703 Network Segments and ANSI C12.22 / IEEE Std 1703 Nodes that are managed by distributed trusted centers, network relays and gateways. As smart grid AMI networks evolve, ANSI C12.22 / IEEE 1703 domains may be created to service the utilities' Field Area Networks (FAN) and the Home/Premise Area Networks (HAN/PAN). Nodes that operate in these domains must be registered with unique application title names (ApTitles) that need to be registered (ECMX).

External links 
 The ANSI C12.22 standard at NEMA
 1703-2012 - IEEE Standard for Local Area Network/Wide Area Network (LAN/WAN) Node Communication Protocol to Complement the Utility Industry End Device Data Tables
 The ANSI C12.19 / IEEE Std 1377 and ANSI ANSI C12.22 / IEEE Std 1703 Registry at ECMX
 North American End Device Registration Authority: In support of ANSI C12.19 / IEEE Std 1377
 : ANSI C12.22, IEEE 1703, and MC12.22 Transport Over IP

References

Telecommunications standards
ANSI C12
IEEE standards
AMI|Smart Meter
IEEE Std 1377|IEEE Std 1701|IEEE Std 1702|IEEE Std 1703|IEEE Std 1704